Bayang, officially the Municipality of Bayang (Maranao and Iranun: Inged a Bayang), is a 5th class municipality in the province of Lanao del Sur, Philippines. According to the 2020 census, it has a population of 28,023 people.

History

In May 1902, during the Moro Rebellion (also known as the Moro–American War), Bayang was the site of a clash between Moro rebels and American troops that became known as the Battle of Bayang. The American troops, three infantry battalions and a battery of artillery total to some 1200 men, were led to Bayang by colonel Frank Baldwin to demand the extradition of the Moros responsible for the ambushing and killing of two American soldiers at the construction of a road from Iligan to Lake Lanao, two months earlier.

When the sultan of Bayang refused, Baldwin's troops attacked and captured the nearby cotta (fortress; "small, castle-like structures with thick, high walls") of Binidayan on 2 May. They subsequently attempted to capture the cotta of Pandapatan, which resisted the artillery fire and was only subdued the next day after hand-to-hand combat between Moros and Americans. The number of Moro casualties is estimated at 300 to 400, including the sultan of Bayang and his brother. On the American side, ten soldiers were killed and some forty wounded.

The cotta of Pandapatan has been preserved as a historical monument; the fallen of the Battle of Bayang are considered martyrs by Filipino Muslims.

Geography

Barangays
Bayang is politically subdivided into 49 barangays.

Climate

Demographics

Economy

Tourism
 Padang Karbala Shrine located at Sultan Pandapatan Bayang
 Malaa Alad
 Dandamun Mosque

Education
Elementary Schools 

Secondary Schools
 Mauyag C. Papandayan National High School, Rinabor, Bayang, Lanao del Sur
 Bayang National High School, Biabi, Bayang, Lanao del Sur
 Upper Bayang National High School,Raya Bubong, Bayang, Lanao del Sur

References

External links
Bayang Profile at the DTI Cities and Municipalities Competitive Index
[ Philippine Standard Geographic Code]
Philippine Census Information
Local Governance Performance Management System

Municipalities of Lanao del Sur
Populated places on Lake Lanao